The Fiat AN.1 was an experimental Italian water-cooled diesel straight six cylinder aircraft engine from the late 1920s.

Design and development
Fiat's interest in Diesel engines dated from 1907, initially focused on slow turning factory engines then moving to higher speed marine and railway motors.  The AN.1 was their first foray into Diesel aero-engines. To shorten its development time and to concentrate on the higher combustion chamber pressures, different burning temperatures and fuel supply systems of the Diesel cycle, they based its design on the Fiat A.12.  This was a petrol engine first run in 1916 and produced in large numbers during World War I, a water-cooled, upright, overhead camshaft straight six. The AN.1 kept the external dimensions and the lower section, crankshaft, crankcase, sump, plus the lubrication and water-cooling supplies of the older engine but required new cylinders, pistons, valve gear and fuel delivery systems to replace carburettors and magnetos. The cylinder barrels had to be stronger to withstand the greater combustion pressures (2-300 atmospheres) required by the compression ignition Diesel. The swept volume of the Diesel engine was reduced by 23.4% as the cylinders had a bore of 140 mm (5.51 in), compared with the A.12's 160 mm (6.30 in). Two camshafts were fitted to operate the four valves per cylinder, though they were driven via the same tall vertical rod used for the single camshaft of the A.12, at its top, and the water pump of both models at its bottom.

The advantages of the Diesel engine were seen as: 
higher fuel efficiency;
mechanical and electrical simplicity;
non-flammable fuel;
cheaper fuel, at the time only 20% the price of petrol.

In 1931 Diesel engines were seen as the future motors of long range commercial aircraft.

The AN.1 was test flown in at least two aircraft, easily replacing the standard Fiat A.12bis in an Ansaldo A.300/4 reconnaissance and attack aircraft and also mounted in a specially designed biplane, the Fiat AN.1.

Operational history
The first public performance of the AN.1 engine was at the Aerial Pageant held at Rome in June 1930 in the AN.1 biplane. This was flown by Renato Donati from the Fiat works at Turin to Rome, a distance of about 510 km (315  mi), on the first morning of the Pageant then displayed over Littorio Airport.

Applications
Ansaldo A.300/4
Fiat AN.1

Specifications

See also

References

1920s aircraft piston engines
Aircraft diesel engines
AN.1